Jan Welmers (6 July 1937 – 7 March 2022) was a Dutch composer and organist.

Life and career
Born in Zuidlaren, the son of an organist and pianist and of an elementary school teacher, Welmers studied at the Prince Claus Conservatoire and at the Utrechts Conservatorium. He was author of a large number of organ compositions, mostly in minimalistic style, starting from 1961. He was professor of organ and music theory at the Utrechts Conservatorium from 1974 to 1998, and organist at the Saint Stephen's Church in Nijmegen from 1974 to 2002. 

He died on 7 March 2022, at the age of 84.

Further reading
 Jan Hage, Hugo Bakker. De hemel draait nog, over Jan Welmers. Valeur Ajoutée, Gouda, 2017.

References

External links 
 

1937 births
2022 deaths
People from Zuidlaren
Dutch classical composers
Dutch organists
Organ improvisers